Southern Sydney is the southern metropolitan area of Sydney, in the state of New South Wales, Australia.

Southern Sydney is a title for the regions and neighbourhoods which fall directly south and south-west of the Sydney CBD from the southern boundaries of Central Station down to the Airport and St George region around the southern and western boundaries of Botany Bay with the southern most concluding point being the Sutherland Shire. This includes all the suburbs in the local government areas of Georges River Council and most of Bayside Council (collectively known as the St George area) as well as the southern suburbs of City of Sydney and broadly it also includes the suburbs in the local government area of Sutherland Shire that are south of the Georges River but north of Port Hacking. The Australian Bureau of Statistics defines a statistical area called the St George-Sutherland Statistical Subdivision.

The southern suburbs of Sydney can be grouped into three parts:

Inner South 

The Inner Southern Suburbs of Sydney include the southern suburbs of City of Sydney as well as some of Bayside Council. The area encompasses the suburbs directly south of Central Station or more specifically Cleveland St leading all the way down to the Airport and fall west of the Eastern Distributor but east of the Alexandra Canal and T3 Train Line. The area starts with Redfern then continues down through Eveleigh, Waterloo, Zetland, Alexandria, Beaconsfield, Rosebery, Eastlakes (West of ED) and ends in Mascot. 

The postcodes start at 2015 and end in 2020 with the suburbs of Botany and Banksmeadow being the exception having the postcode of 2019 which while being geographically south of the CBD along with the included suburbs are actually past the Airport and on the other side of the Eastern Distributor deeming them South-East and not inner south. 

The region consists of three train stations being Redfern, Green Square and Mascot as well as one future Metro station in Waterloo. Green Square is a locality situated at the meeting point of Alexandria, Zetland, Waterloo, and Beaconsfield. Green Square and Mascot station are on the Airport Link completed in 2000 which is part of the T8 Airport & South Line. Many of these suburbs were predominantly industrial and commercial but have now developed into new residential neighbourhoods of high rise apartments.

The Inner Southern Suburbs are often considered an indefinite region of Sydney as it is sometimes considered Inner city or included as part of the Eastern Suburbs or more specifically South-East however strictly speaking these suburbs geographically are neither east nor south-east of the Sydney CBD.

St George 

The St George area includes all the suburbs in the Georges River Council and part of Bayside Council which was Rockdale City prior to 2016. The eastern boundary of the district is Lady Robinson Beach on Botany Bay. This area corresponds to the cadastral Parish of St George, from which the region derives its name. The western part of the Parish of St George was formerly in the City of Canterbury and now within City of Canterbury-Bankstown. The St George region while being part of the southern suburbs is sometimes referred to as the inner south-west due to its geographical location from Sydney CBD.

Sutherland Shire 

The Sutherland Shire is the area to the south of Botany Bay and the Georges River.

The administrative centre of the local government is located in the suburb of Sutherland.

Suburbs in Southern Sydney

Inner South
{|width=100%
|
 Alexandria
 Beaconsfield
 Eastlakes (West of ED)
 Eveleigh
 Mascot
 Redfern
 Rosebery
 Waterloo
 Zetland

Localities in the inner south include:
{|width=100%
|
 Green Square

St George

Sutherland Shire Suburbs

Localities administered by the Sutherland Shire are:

References

External links 
Sydney South - Sydney.com

Regions of Sydney